Group B was one of two pools in the Americas Zone Group II of the 1997 Fed Cup. Seven teams competed in a round robin competition, with the top team advancing to Group I in 1998.

Uruguay vs. Jamaica

Cuba vs. Bermuda

Bolivia vs. Costa Rica

El Salvador vs. Antigua and Barbuda

Uruguay vs. Antigua and Barbuda

Cuba vs. El Salvador

Jamaica vs. Costa Rica

Bolivia vs. Bermuda

Uruguay vs. Costa Rica

Cuba vs. Antigua and Barbuda

Jamaica vs. Bermuda

Bolivia vs. El Salvador

Uruguay vs. Cuba

Jamaica vs. El Salvador

Bolivia vs. Antigua and Barbuda

Costa Rica vs. Bermuda

Uruguay vs. Bermuda

Cuba vs. Bolivia

Jamaica vs. Antigua and Barbuda

Costa Rica vs. El Salvador

Uruguay vs. Bolivia

Cuba vs. Jamaica

Costa Rica vs. Antigua and Barbuda

El Salvador vs. Bermuda

Uruguay vs. El Salvador

Cuba vs. Costa Rica

Jamaica vs. Bolivia

Bermuda vs. Antigua and Barbuda

  placed first in the pool, and thus advanced to Group I in 1998. However, they placed eighth overall were thus relegated back to Group II for 1999.

See also
Fed Cup structure

References

External links
 Fed Cup website

1997 Fed Cup Americas Zone